Alexander "Alex" Crow McGeorge (4 August 1868 – 14 January 1953) was a New Zealand engineer and gold dredging entrepreneur, contributing to the Otago gold boom of the 1890s.

Biography 

McGeorge was born in Dunedin on 4 August 1868 to Scottish parents, James McGeorge and Isabella Crow. McGeorge, along with his brothers John Crow and Joseph founded the Electric Gold Dredging Company in 1895, one of the most successful gold-dredging companies in New Zealand.

McGeorge's mother, Isabella Crow, and sister, Jane, were both signatories of the 1893 Women's Suffrage Petition.

The McGeorge brothers' most famous gold dredge was the Lady Ranfurly, named by the then-present Governor of New Zealand, Uchter Knox, 5th Earl of Ranfurly after his own wife on a visit to Cromwell on 12 March 1898.

Alex McGeorge died in Karitane on 14 January 1953.

Relations 
New Zealand entrepreneur Jeremy Moon is a direct descendant of McGeorge (McGeorge is his great-grandfather).

References

1868 births
1953 deaths
Engineers from Dunedin
19th-century New Zealand engineers
19th-century New Zealand businesspeople